Jos Stam (born 28 December 1965 in The Hague, Netherlands) is a researcher in the field of computer graphics, focusing on the simulation of natural physical phenomena for 3D-computer animation. He achieved technical breakthroughs with the simulation of fluids and gases, new rendering algorithms and subdivision surfaces, which are a mix between two previously incompatible worlds of Nurbs- and polygon-modeling in 3D.

Education and career

Jos Stam's maternal grandfather was the Dutch politician Sim Visser. He emigrated to the US in 1956, where he worked as a researcher for the DuPont de Nemours Company. He became a US citizen in 1964. In the US he met his wife, Alida Wilhelmina Visser, born in Wassenaar (Netherlands). In early 1965, Jos' father was transferred by DuPont to Geneva, Switzerland, where Jos was born as their third child in December 1965.
In order to avoid statelessness of their third child,  Jos' mother gave birth to him in  The Hague, so that he obtained Dutch citizenship. Jos got his schooling in French at Geneva. In 1988 he received his bachelor's degree in computer science and a year later in pure mathematics, both at the University of Geneva, and his Masters and Ph.D. in computer science at the Dynamic Graphics Project at University of Toronto.  After graduating, he held two postdoc positions, one at INRIA (in Paris, France) and one at VTT (in Helsinki, Finland).

He then joined SGI's Aliaswavefront division (which later spun out as Alias Systems Corporation) as a full-time researcher in Toronto and Seattle. He started with particle systems for the PowerAnimator software package. Then he made significant contributions to the fluids simulation component of Alias' Maya 3D content creation software product.  As a result of Alias being acquired by Autodesk in early 2006, Stam became a "Senior Research Scientist" at Autodesk, Inc. in Toronto. At Alias and Autodesk Jos Stam has worked closely together with Duncan Brinsmead, another expert in the simulation of natural phenomena. Stam left Autodesk in 2018.

Awards
 SIGGRAPH Computer Graphics Achievement Award (2005) for his contributions to the field of computer graphics
 Academy Award for Technical Achievement (2005) for his work on subdivision surfaces and their resulting impact in the film industry.
 Academy Award for Technical Achievement (2008) for the design and implementation of the Maya Fluid Effects system.

References

External links
Interview with Jos Stam, SIGGRAPH, 2002
Article on Jos Stam, Wired, 20 December 2007
Podcast with Jos Stam, 4 November 2022

1965 births
Living people
University of Toronto alumni
Computer graphics researchers
Dutch computer scientists
Silicon Graphics people
Academy Award for Technical Achievement winners
Scientists from The Hague